Chishma (Şişmä) is a rural locality (a selo) in Ismailovsky Selsoviet, Dyurtyulinsky District, Bashkortostan, Russia. The population was 472 as of 2010. There are 6 streets.

Geography 
Chishma is located 24 km northwest of Dyurtyuli (the district's administrative centre) by road. Zitembyak is the nearest rural locality.

References 

Rural localities in Dyurtyulinsky District